Raul Loyola Lambino (born March 9, 1958) is a Filipino lawyer. He rose to prominence when he led the signature campaign to amend or revise the 1987 Philippine Constitution.

Lambino is married to Marilyn de Guzman, and has three children: Mark Ronald, Mary Rhauline, and Meryllainne Rhacquel.

Education
Lambino earned a Bachelor of Arts in Political Science, cum laude, from the University of Pangasinan in 1981.  He obtained his Bachelor of Laws degree, valedictorian and cum laude also from the University of Pangasinan in 1986.

Career
Lambino is an active trial lawyer. He is the Managing Partner of the R. Lambino & Partners Law Firm located at 2502D Philippine Stock Exchange Centre, Ortigas, Pasig. He has also been a senior partner at Gavero Lambino Almadro Villanueva Law Firm from 1995 to 2000.

Academe
Lambino is a Professor of Law at the University of the East College of Law in Manila; and the University of Pangasinan College of Law in Dagupan. He has also been an Instructor of Political Science at the University of Pangasinan College of Liberal Arts from 1982 to 1987.

Government
Lambino has been a Consultant and Coordinator for the Philippine House of Representatives contingent to the Commission on Appointments. a Consultant in the Office of the Speaker of the Philippine House of Representatives from 1995 to 1998, and from 2000 to 2001; the Chief-of-Staff in the Office of Senator Loren Legarda from 1998 to 2000; the  Chief of Staff in the Office of Speaker Jose De Venecia from 1995 to 1998; and the Officer-in-Charge Provincial Board Member of the Province of Pangasinan  from 1987 to 1988.

Organizational affiliations
Lambino is an Ambassador for Peace at the Inter-religious and International Confederation for World Peace; and the Interreligious and International Peace Council. He is a Life Member of the Philippine Constitution Association (Philconsa), and an active member of the
ASEAN Law Association and the Integrated Bar of the Philippines.

He is also the Chairman of Green Smiley through Green Team Pilipinas.
He is also a member of Alpha Phi Omega-Alpha Gamma Chapter.

External links
University of the East
Consultative Commission for Charter Change

References

1958 births
20th-century Filipino lawyers
Filipino educators
Living people
People from Dagupan
Recipients of the Presidential Medal of Merit (Philippines)
21st-century Filipino lawyers
Academic staff of the University of the East